Larnax andersonii is a species of plant in the family Solanaceae. It is endemic to Ecuador.

References

Flora of Ecuador
andersonii
Vulnerable plants
Taxonomy articles created by Polbot
Plants described in 1998